FK Šumperk is a Czech football club located in Šumperk in the Olomouc Region. The club now plays at the fifth level of Czech football, the Olomouc Regional Championship, after being relegated from the Czech Fourth Division in 2014.

Since 2011, Šumperk have been the farm team of second tier National League club SK Sigma Olomouc.

References

External links
  
 Olomouc Region results

Sumperk
Association football clubs established in 1945
Sport in the Olomouc Region